Institute of Higher Education of NAPS (National Academy of Pedagogical Sciences) of Ukraine - is one of the NAPS Institutes responsible for control, research and development of system of higher education.

History 

The Institute was created on 7 June 1999 according to a decree of Cabinet of Ministers of Ukraine №988.

One of the last organization's final achievements was participation in the creation of the National Agency for Quality Assurance in Higher Education.

References

External links
 Website

Sources 

Universities and colleges in Kyiv
Higher education in Ukraine